Lukáš Dlouhý and Michal Mertiňák were the defending champions, but Dlouhý chose not to compete. Mertiňák played with Mikhail Elgin but lost to eventual runners-up Daniele Bracciali and Florin Mergea. Nicholas Monroe and Simon Stadler won the title 6–2, 6–4 over Bracciali and Mergea.

Seeds

Draw

Draw

References
 Doubles Draw

San Marino CEPU Open - Doubles
San Marino CEPU Open